Nummelin is a Finnish surname. Notable people with the surname include:

Petteri Nummelin (born 1972), Finnish ice hockey player
Timo Nummelin (born 1948), Finnish footballer and ice hockey player

Finnish-language surnames